In economics, a cycle of poverty or poverty trap is caused by self-reinforcing mechanisms that cause poverty, once it exists, to persist unless there is outside intervention. It can persist across generations, and when applied to developing countries, is also known as a development trap.

Families trapped in the cycle of poverty have few to no resources. There are many self-reinforcing disadvantages that make it virtually impossible for individuals to break the cycle. This occurs when poor people do not have the resources necessary to escape poverty, such as financial capital, education, or connections. Impoverished individuals do not have access to economic and social resources as a result of their poverty. This lack may increase their poverty. This could mean that the poor remain poor throughout their lives.

Controversial educational psychologist Ruby K. Payne, author of A Framework for Understanding Poverty, distinguishes between situational poverty, which can generally be traced to a specific incident within the lifetimes of the person or family members in poverty, and generational poverty, which is a cycle that passes from generation to generation, and goes on to argue that generational poverty has its own distinct culture and belief patterns.

Measures of social mobility examine how frequently poor people become wealthier, and how often children are wealthier or achieve higher income than their parents.

Causes of the cycle

Chronic general poverty
Poverty can be created or sustained for large numbers of people through general economic conditions, which tend to be self-sustaining.  Metrics for these conditions include:
 Low gross domestic product or overall low productivity, failing to produce enough wealth for the population as a whole to escape poverty
 High unemployment, creating poverty for the unemployed and putting downward pressure on wages
 A lack of education, which prevents people from getting high income jobs.

 Low social mobility, perpetuating poverty for a given person or family
There are also various poverty metrics that directly indicate its extent, generally involving income, wealth, or both.  It can be measured on an absolute scale (which might put almost an entire country's population below the poverty line) or in a relative way, identifying people who are poor compared to others in the same country.

Countries with chronically low levels of economic development fail to provide opportunities for many individuals to leave poverty.  These may be caused by:
 Problems with the means of production:
 Lack of or poor quality infrastructure
 Widespread lack of skills needed for employment (including education) or high-wage employment
 Lack of equipment and automation that would boost productivity
 Economic mismanagement, such as regulatory failure 
 Widespread corruption
 Inability of the government to guarantee stable market conditions, including physical security and enforceable property rights
 High burden of disease
 Barriers to international trade, possibly including international sanctions

Non-circular causes of poverty
Generally poor economic conditions can also be due to temporary causes, which might not result in a "cycle of poverty" if the economy recovers thereafter. Temporary economic problems can be caused by:
 Recession (for which there are many causes) and the lower-activity portion of the business cycle
 Climate change 
 Disasters
 War, whether through direct destruction or general funding burden
 Natural disasters, including storms, drought, and earthquakes
 Epidemics
 Famine
 Anthropogenic disasters, including accidents

A one-time event, whether affecting the economy in general or personal in nature, can push a given person or family into poverty, after which they enter the "cycle of poverty" which is difficult to escape. Examples of personal events that can have a negative economic impact include:
 The loss of a job or failure of a family-owned business
 A health issue, which can result in lost wages, a permanent disability, or medical debt in countries without free universal health care
 The death of a family member
 An unplanned pregnancy
 Short-term financial mismanagement of personal savings or debt
 A breakup or divorce, if alimony does not compensate for the loss of one partner's income
 A foreclosure or eviction
 An automobile collision or other loss of a vehicle needed to get to work
 Commission of a crime that results in a criminal record and difficulty obtaining work
 Incarceration that results in loss of economic assets and social networks

Factors maintaining personal poverty
Once poor, people can experience difficulty escaping poverty because many changes that would allow them to do so require money they don't have, such as:
 Education and retraining with new skills
 Child care which would enable a single parent or second parent to work or take classes
 Transportation to a distant job
 Migration to an area with better economic opportunities
 Starting a new business, which might require market research, technical assistance, and startup funding
 Obtaining land for subsistence farming
 Curing a health condition that prevents work, including diseases of poverty which don't affect people outside of the "cycle of poverty"

According to the United States Census, in 2012 people aged 18–64 living in poverty in the country gave the reason they did not work, by category:
 31% - Ill or disabled
 26% - Home or family reasons
 21% - School or other
 13% - Cannot find work
 8% - Retired early

Some activities can also cost poor people more than wealthier people:
 Rent – If unable to afford the first month's rent and security deposit for a typical apartment lease, people sometimes must live in a hotel or motel at a higher daily rate.
 Food
 If unable to afford an apartment with a refrigerator, kitchen, and stove, people may need to spend more on prepared meals than if they could cook for themselves and store leftovers.
 Buying in bulk (large quantities) is usually cheaper than buying small quantities in multiple transactions, but poor people are less likely to have cash on hand to finance a large purchase of food needed for the more distant future. Poor people are less able to afford delivery or automobile transport of quantities too large to carry on public transit or bicycle.
 People who live in food deserts without access to fast transportation may buy more expensive food from nearby convenience stores,  and have more difficulty transporting perishable goods.
 Banking – People who cannot maintain a minimum daily balance in a savings account are often charged fees by the bank, whereas people with larger amounts of wealth can earn interest on savings and substantial returns from investments.  Unbanked people must use higher-cost alternative financial services, such as check-cashing services for payroll and money orders for transferring to other people. People who have had previous credit problems, such as overdrafting an account, may not be eligible to open a checking or savings account.  Major reasons for not opening a bank account include not trusting banks, being concerned about not making a payment due to a bank error or delay, not understanding how banks work, and not having enough money to qualify for a free account.
 Debt – People who have no net savings sometimes have to use high-interest credit cards or other loans to pay for emergency expenses or even daily needs.  Interest must be paid on debt, and a lower credit score (which can result from a low income) typically results in a higher interest rate, such as for a subprime mortgage.  Payday loans can have an extremely high interest rate, and other forms of debt not typically used by high-income consumers include refund anticipation loans, car title loans, and pawnshops. In addition, individuals with low credit scores may fail credit checks when employers request them.
 Overdue payments – People who cannot afford to pay all of their bills on time, or who accidentally make a late payment due to waiting until the last possible day can incur late fees not affecting people who can simply schedule automatic payments from savings.
 Furniture – If unable to afford a piece of furniture, a rent-to-own agreement can make it available without having savings, but at a higher long-term cost.
 Transportation – If unable to afford a car, taking public transportation can take longer, effectively an increased cost in the form of lost time.  Many poor people must live further away from work in order to find housing they can afford.
 Health care – Though most industrialized countries have free universal health care, in the United States and many developing countries, people with little savings often postpone expensive medical treatment as long as possible. This can cause a relatively small medical condition to become a serious condition that costs more to treat, and possibly causing lost wages due to missed hourly work. (Though poor people may have lower overall personal medical expenses simply because illnesses and medical conditions go untreated, and on average life span is shorter.) Higher-income workers typically have medical insurance which prevents them from experiencing excessive costs and often provides free preventive care for example.  In addition to personal savings they can use, higher-income workers are also more likely to be salaried and get sick time that prevents them from losing wages while seeking treatment. Because no skills or experience are required, some people in poverty make money by volunteering for medical studies or donating blood plasma.
 Government benefits may require paperwork or attendance at mandatory classes that a job wouldn't, effectively an increased cost in the form of lost time per unit of money taken in.

Government policy, government funding, and access to financial services can play a large role in preventing one-time events from pushing people into poverty, and in overcoming barriers to escaping poverty.  People who cannot work due to a disability often rely on government assistance, family members, or charities, but may also have personal savings. Many governments have programs to support the elderly, given that many have not saved enough money to last throughout their planned retirement, and that many will experience health problems that prevent them from working. Inability to work can present an insurmountable barrier to exiting poverty if external assistance is insufficient.

Internal and external factors sustaining poverty 
Amongst the most popular characterizations of the ongoing experience of poverty are that:
 it is systemic or institutionalized or
 a person is misguided by emotional challenges driven by historical experiences or
 a person is affected by a mental disability,
or a combination of all three reasons (Bertrand, Mullainathan, & Shafir, 2004).

Systemic factors 
Donald Curtis (2006), a researcher at the School of Public Policy in the United Kingdom, identified that governments regard the welfare system as an enabling task. Curtis (2006) maintained, however, that the system lacks cohesiveness, and is not designed to be an empowerment tool.

For example, outside parties are funded to manage the effort without much oversight creating a disconnected system, for which no one leads (Curtis, 2006). The result is mismanagement of budget without forwarding progress, and those that remain in the poverty loophole are accused of draining the system (Curtis, 2006).

Bias 
Jill Suttie (2018), wrote that implicit bias, which can be transferred nonverbally to children with no more than a look or a gesture, and as such is a learned behavior. Critical thinking skills can ward off implicit bias, but without education and practice, habitual thoughts can cloud judgment and poorly affect future decisions.

Decision-making 
A Dartmouth College (2016) study reported that probabilistic decision-making follows prior-based knowledge of failure in similar situations. Rather than choose success, people respond as if the failure has already taken place. Those who have experienced intergenerational poverty are most susceptible to this kind of learned behavior (Wagmiller & Adelman, 2009).

Intergenerational 
Professors of Sociology Wagmiller and Adelman (2009) asserted that roughly 35–46% of people who have experienced hardship in young and middle adulthood also experienced moderate to severe poverty in childhood. As of 2018, 7.5 million people experienced poverty in California alone (Downs, 2018).

Mental illness 
In a qualitative study, Rudnick et al., (2014), studied people living in poverty with mental illness and determined that participants felt that wellness care, nutrition, housing, and jobs were severely lacking. Respondents asserted that the most significant problem was access to quality services; bureaucratic systems appear to be devoid of logic and treatment by providers were often unaccommodating and uncooperative (Rudnick et al., 2014).

Lowered productivity 

The stress of worrying about one's personal finances can cause lower productivity. One study on factory workers in India found payment earlier in the work period increased average worker output by 6.2%.

Choices and culture
Personal choices and cultural influences can also make it difficult to escape poverty, such as:
 Choosing not to pursue education and skills that could be used to obtain a high-paying job
 A culture that disvalues education
 Low expectations for academic and economic success can be a self-fulfilling prophecy
 Belief that one is self-limited and destined to remain trapped in poverty
 Belief that one is a victim and powerless to break free from poverty

According to the Brookings Institution, people who follow all three of the following steps end up with a poverty rate of only 2%, whereas people who follow none of the steps end up with a poverty rate of 76%.

 Finish high school.
 Get a full-time job.
 Wait until age 21 and get married before having children.

Correlation does not imply causation and these statistics could also indicate these three milestones are completely unavailable to 76% of the populations in poverty, and only 2% of the poor manage all three.

Discrimination and concentration
Discrimination can make it more difficult to access government programs, to find work, and to access resources and social networks that could help. For a variety of reasons, it is more difficult to escape poverty in areas of concentrated poverty, where poor people may be forced to live by economic circumstance. Racial segregation can represent a combination of both discrimination and concentration.

Generational poverty
Generational poverty is poverty that is inherited across generations.  This can happen because:
 Poor parents who know what their children need to succeed academically or economically cannot afford to provide that, such as tuition, books, tutoring, after-school programs, health care, transportation to school, safe housing, clothing, or adequate nutrition.
 Parents who are outside social networks that would be useful for economic advancement cannot introduce those children into those networks. In addition, they may not emphasize the value of networking to their children.
 Poor parents may pressure older children to drop out of school and work, for immediate wages at the expense of education that could provide higher long-term wages.
 Parents who have themselves not attended secondary education, may not realize the advantages of attendance, and may not know when or how to apply.
 Poorly educated parents might not know how to nurture the cognitive development of their children, and might be less able to provide educational assistance like help with homework.
 Parents who have made poor personal decisions may be bad role models for success, for example normalizing financial mismanagement or substance abuse.
 Child abuse creates a number of physical and psychological problems that increase the probability of growing up poor, and the vast majority of abusive parents were themselves abused as children.

Early childhood adversity and basic needs stressors contributing to the cycle of generational poverty 

The stress of early childhood adversities, including basic need stressors and, at times, abuse and neglect are major causes of generational poverty. Studies have shown that the trauma of child abuse manifests negatively in adult life in overall health and even in employment status. Abuse and neglect are potential adversities facing those in poverty, the adversity that is shared among all below the poverty line is the daily stress over basic needs. "The stress of meeting basic needs takes all precedent in the family, and children learn that the only way to survive is to focus on getting basic needs met". Every member of a household in poverty lives the struggle of basic needs stressors and is impacted by it. The ability to secure and pay for childcare is another contributing factor to the problems those in poverty have with finding and keeping a job. These stressors are not just unpleasant, they are catastrophic to a body's health and development.   Exposure to chronic stress can induce changes in the architecture of different regions of the developing brain (e.g., amygdala, hippocampus), which can impact a range of important functions, such as regulating the stress response, attention, memory, planning, and learning new skills, and also contribute to dysregulation of inflammatory response systems that can lead to a chronic "wear and tear" effect on multiple organ systems. Chronic stress is detrimental to our health and has even been proven to harm memory and organs, including the brain. Working memory, defined as a human's capacity to store information in the brain for immediate use, is known to be shorter for children raised in poverty versus those raised in even a middle-class environment. Children suffering through basic needs stressors from the earliest of years have to work harder than their peers to learn and absorb information.

Family background
A 2002 research paper titled "The Changing Effect of Family Background on the Incomes of American Adults" analyzed changes in the determinants of family income between 1961 and 1999,
focusing on the effect of parental education, occupational rank, income, marital status, family size, region of residence, race, and ethnicity. The paper (1) outlines a simple framework for thinking about how family background affects children's family and income, (2) summarizes previous research on trends in intergenerational inheritance in the United States, (3) describes the data used as a basis for the research which it describes, (4) discusses trends in inequality among parents, (5) describes how the effects of parental inequality changed between 1961 and 1999, (6) contrasts effects at the top and bottom of the distribution, and (7) discusses whether intergenerational correlations of zero would be desirable. The paper concludes by posing the question of whether reducing the intergenerational correlation is an efficient strategy for reducing poverty or inequality.

Because improving the skills of disadvantaged children seems relatively easy, it is an attractive strategy. However, judging by American experience since the 1960s, improving the skills of disadvantaged children has proved difficult. As a result, the paper suggests, there are probably cheaper and easier ways to reduce poverty and inequality, such as supplementing the wages of the poor or changing immigration policy so that it drives down the relative wages of skilled rather than unskilled workers. These alternative strategies would not reduce intergenerational correlations, but they would reduce the economic gap between children who started life with all the disadvantages instead of all the advantages.

Another paper, titled Do poor children become poor adults?, which was originally presented at a 2004 symposium on the future of children from disadvantaged families in France, and was later included in a 2006 collection of papers related to the theme of the dynamics of inequality and poverty, discusses generational income mobility in North America and Europe. The paper opens by observing that in the United States almost one half of children born to low income parents become low income adults, four in ten in the United Kingdom, and one-third in Canada. The paper goes on to observe that rich children also tend to become rich adults—four in ten in the U.S. and the U.K., and as many as one-third in Canada. The paper argues, however, that money is not the only or even the most important factor influencing intergenerational income mobility. The rewards to higher skilled and/or higher educated individuals in the labor market and the opportunities for children to obtain the required skills and credentials are two important factors. Conclusions that income transfers to lower income individuals may be important to children but they should not be counted on to strongly promote generational mobility. The paper recommends that governments focus on investments in children to ensure that they have the skills and opportunities to succeed in the labor market, and observes that though this has historically meant promoting access to higher and higher levels of education, it is becoming increasingly important that attention be paid to preschool and early childhood education.

Lack of jobs due to deindustrialization

Sociologist William Julius Wilson has said that the economic restructuring of changes from manufacturing to a service-based economy has led to a high percentage of joblessness in the inner-cities and with it a loss of skills and inability to find jobs. This "mismatch" of skills to jobs available is said to be the main driver of poverty.

Effects of modern education
Research shows that schools with students who perform lower than the norm are also those hiring least-qualified teachers as a result of new teachers generally working in the area that they grew up in. This leads to certain schools not producing many students who enter tertiary education. Graduates who previously attended these schools are not as skilled as they would be if they had gone to a school with higher-qualified instructors. This leads to education perpetuating a cycle of poverty. People who choose to work in the schools close to them do not adequately supply the school with enough teachers. The schools must then outsource their teachers from other areas. Susanna Loeb from the School of Education at Stanford conducted a study and found that teachers who are brought in from the suburbs are 10 times more likely to transfer out of the school after their initial year. The fact that the teachers from the suburbs leave appears to be an influential factor for schools hiring more teachers from that area. The lack of adequate education for children is part of what allows for the cycle of poverty to continue. The problem undergoing this is the lack of updating the knowledge of the staff. Schools have continued to conduct professional development the same way they have for decades.

Culture of poverty
Another theory for the perpetual cycle of poverty is that poor people have their own culture with a different set of values and beliefs that keep them trapped within that cycle generation to generation. This theory has been explored by Ruby K. Payne in her book A Framework for Understanding Poverty. In this book she explains how a social class system in the United States exists, where there is a wealthy upper class, a middle class, and the working poor class. These classes each have their own set of rules and values, which differ from each other. To understand the culture of poverty, Payne describes how these rules affect the poor and tend to keep them trapped in this continual cycle. Time is treated differently by the poor; they generally do not plan ahead but simply live in the moment, which keeps them from saving money that could help their children escape poverty.

Payne emphasizes how important it is when working with the poor to understand their unique cultural differences so that one does not get frustrated but instead tries to work with them on their ideologies and help them to understand how they can help themselves and their children escape the cycle. One aspect of generational poverty is a learned helplessness that is passed from parents to children; a mentality that there is no way for one to get out of poverty and so in order to make the best of the situation one must enjoy what one can when one can. This leads to such habits as spending money immediately, often on unnecessary goods such as alcohol and cigarettes, thus teaching their children to do the same and trapping them in poverty. Another important point Payne makes is that leaving poverty is not as simple as acquiring money and moving into a higher class but also includes giving up certain relationships in exchange for achievement. A student's peers can have an influence on the child's level of achievement. Coming from a low-income household a child could be teased or expected to fall short academically. This can cause a student to feel discouraged and hold back when it comes to getting involved more with their education because they are scared to be teased if they fail. This helps to explain why the culture of poverty tends to endure from generation to generation as most of the relationships the poor have are within that class.

The "culture of poverty" theory has been debated and critiqued by many people including Eleanor Burke Leacock (and others) in her book The Culture of Poverty: A Critique. Leacock claims that people who use the term, "culture of poverty" only "contribute to the distorted characterizations of the poor." In addition, Michael Hannan in an essay argues that the "culture of poverty" is "essentially untestable." This is due to many things including the highly subjective nature of poverty and issues concerning the universal act of classifying only some impoverished people as trapped in the culture.

Life shocks 
2004 research in New Zealand produced a report that showed that "life shocks" can be endured only to a limited extent, after which people are much more likely to be tipped into hardship. The researchers found very little differences in living standards for people who have endured up to 7 negative events in their lifetime. People who had 8 or more life shocks were dramatically more likely to live in poverty than those who had 0 to 7 life shocks. A few of the life shocks studied were:
 Marriage (or similar) break-ups (divorce)
 Forced sale of house
 Unexpected and substantial drop in income
 Eviction
 Bankruptcy
 Substantial financial loss
 Redundancy (being laid off from a job)
 Becoming a single parent
 3 months or more unemployed
 Major damage to home
 House burgled
 Victim of violence
 Incarceration
 A non-custodial sentence (community service, or fines, but not imprisonment)
 Illness lasting three weeks or more
 Major injury or health problem
 Unplanned pregnancy and birth of a child

The study focused on just a few possible life shocks, but many others are likely as traumatic or more so. Chronic PTSD, complex PTSD, and depression sufferers could have innumerable causes for their mental illness, including those studied above. The study is subject to some criticism.

Tracking in education
History in the United States has shown that Americans saw education as the way to end the perpetual cycle of poverty. In the present, children from low to middle income households are at a disadvantage. They are twice as likely to be held back and more likely not to graduate from high school. Recent studies have shown that the cause for the disparity among academic achievement results from the school's structure where some students succeed from an added advantage and others fail as a result of lacking that advantage. Educational institutions with a learning disparity are causing education to be a sustaining factor for the cycle of poverty. One prominent example of this type of school structures is tracking, which is predominantly used to help organize a classroom so the variability of academic ability in classes is decreased. Students are tracked based on their ability level, generally based on a standardized test after which they are given different course requirements. Some people believe that tracking "enhances academic achievement and improves the self-concept of students by permitting them to progress at their own pace."

The negative side is that studies have shown that tracking decreases students' opportunity to learn. Tracking also has a disproportionate number of Latinos and African Americans that have low socioeconomic status in the lower learning tracks. Tracking separates social classes putting the poor and minority children in lower tracks where they receive second-rate education, and the students who are better off are placed in upper tracks where they have many opportunities for success. Studies have found that in addition to the higher tracks having more extensive curriculum, there is also a disparity among the teachers and instructional resources provided. There appears to be a race/class bias which results in intelligent children not receiving the skills or opportunities needed for success or social/economic mobility, thus continuing the cycle of poverty. There is an overall perception that American education is failing and research has done nothing to counter this statement, but instead has revealed the reality and severity of the issue of the existence of tracking and other structures that cause the cycle of poverty to continue.

Theories and strategies for breaking the cycle

General approaches 
While many governmental officials are still trying to solve poverty, many states and localities are making an effort to break the cycle. Mayor Bloomberg of New York City has been advocating a plan where parents are paid up to $5,000 a year for meeting certain goals that will better their lives. This policy was modeled after a Mexican initiative that aims to help poor families make better decisions that will help them in the long-term and break cycle of poverty and dependence that have been known to last for generations. In addition, many states also have been making an attempt to help break the cycle. For example, a bill has been proposed in the California Assembly that "would establish an advisory Childhood Poverty Council to develop a plan to reduce child poverty in the state by half by 2017 and eliminate it by 2027". Even when the plan has poverty reduction as the goal, a rise in child poverty might be the reality for many states as it was in Connecticut. States are attempting to not only decrease the number of people in the cycle of poverty, but to also adjust the stringent work requirements that resulted from Congress's welfare reform. The tougher work restrictions have upset many poverty advocates who believe the new regulations prevent individuals who are vulnerable or who lack skills from preparing for work. California Democratic Representative McDermott believes as a result of this and other effects of the new limitations, it has been harder for individuals to escape a life of poverty.

In his book Children in Jeopardy: Can We Break the Cycle, Irving B. Harris discusses ways in which children can be helped to begin breaking the cycle of poverty. He stresses the importance of starting early and teaching children the importance of education from a very young age as well as making sure these children get the same educational opportunities as students who are richer. Family values such as nurturing children and encouraging them to do well in school need to be promoted as well as a non-authoritarian approach to parenting. Harris also discusses the importance of discouraging teenage pregnancy and finding ways in which to decrease this phenomenon so that when children are born they are planned and wanted and thus have a better chance at breaking the cycle of poverty.

It has been suggested by researchers like Lane Kenworthy that increasing welfare benefits and extending them to non-working families can help reduce poverty as nations that have done so have had better results.

The Harlem Children's Zone is working to end generational poverty within a 100-block section of Harlem using an approach that provides educational support and services for children and their families from birth through college.
This approach has been recognized as a model by the Obama administration's anti-poverty program.

Two-generation poverty alleviation approach 
A two-generation poverty alleviation approach focuses on the education, health and social services, and opportunities that parents and children desperately need to lift their families from the depths of the bondage of poverty to a stable and healthy state mentally, physically, and financially. A two-generation approach is a holistic plan for poverty alleviation and "is needed to help low-income parents and children improve their situation". Using a two-generation approach, parents are taught additional career skills, provided leadership training, and given access to job opportunities with higher wages. Children are given access to better educational programs, free preschool, free childcare, and the supplies they'll need to be successful in school. The family unit receives counseling for the current stressors of poverty as well as childhood trauma. All members of the household are given access to full healthcare benefits, food services at home and in school, and financial relief for their bills, clothing, and transportation in the short-term to relieve the basic needs stressors that prevent the family from taking the time to learn and grow. The preschool program Head Start believes that the only system that works for a preschool is one where the child as a whole is considered, which includes their health and their parents' ability to succeed. The two-generation poverty alleviation approach sees each member relieved of the basic needs stressors that plague their minds, ensures that they are physically and mentally healthy, provides them the opportunities to learn the skills needed for higher wage jobs, and gives them access to higher wage jobs without discrimination.

Effects on children

Children are most vulnerable to the cycle of poverty. Because a child is dependent on their guardian(s), if a child's guardian is in poverty, then they will be also. It is almost impossible for a child to pull themself out of the cycle due to age, lack of experience, lack of a job, etc. Because children are at such a young and impressionable age, the scars they gain from experiencing poverty early in life inevitably carry on into their adult life. "Childhood lays the foundations for adult abilities, interests, and motivation." Therefore, if they learn certain poverty-related behaviors in childhood, the behaviors are more likely to perpetuate.

Studies have shown that household structure sometimes has a connection to childhood poverty. Most studies on the subject also show that the children who are in poverty tend to come from single-parent households (most often matriarchal). In 1997, nearly 8.5 million (57%) poor children in the US came from single-parent households. With the rate of divorce increasing and the number of children born out of wedlock increasing, the number of children who are born into or fall into single-parent households is also increasing. However, this does not mean that the child/children will be impoverished because of it.

According to Ashworth, Hill, & Walker (2004), both urban and rural poor children are more likely to be isolated from the nonpoor in schools, neighborhoods, and their communities. Human nature is to have relationships with others but when a child is isolated due to their socioeconomic status, it's hard to overcome that when the status doesn't improve. Therefore, poor children also have more tense relationships which sometimes results in abnormal, non-constructive, or other unexplained behaviors.

There have been programs developed to specifically address the needs of poor children. Francis Marion University's Center of Excellence to Prepare Teachers of Children of Poverty has a number of initiatives devoted to equipping teachers to be more effective in raising the achievement of children of poverty. It is located in South Carolina and provides direct teacher training as well as facilitates research in the area of poverty and scholastic achievement. Head Start is a program for low income families who provides early childhood education as well as parent involvement. Results show that attending these programs increases children's academic outcomes. The problem is that in high poverty areas this is supposed to be a helpful resource, but they start to hold lower quality due to lack of funds to keep places updated.

Often the communities in which impoverished children grow up in are crime ridden areas; examples of these areas in America are Harlem and the Bronx. Crime and maltreatment at a young age may reduce a child's ability to learn by up to 5%. Adopting a criminal lifestyle only worsens the effects of the cycle as they are often incarcerated or killed in many types of gang violence.

Developing world
In the developing world, many factors can contribute to a poverty trap, including: limited access to credit and capital markets, extreme environmental degradation (which depletes agricultural production potential), corrupt governance, capital flight, poor education systems, disease ecology, lack of public health care, war and poor infrastructure.

Jeffrey Sachs, in his book The End of Poverty, discusses the poverty trap and prescribes a set of policy initiatives intended to end the trap. He recommends that aid agencies behave as venture capitalists funding start-up companies. Venture capitalists, once they choose to invest in a venture, do not give only half or a third of the amount they feel the venture needs in order to become profitable; if they did, their money would be wasted. If all goes as planned, the venture will eventually become profitable and the venture capitalist will experience an adequate rate of return on investment. Likewise, Sachs proposes, developed countries cannot give only a fraction of what is needed in aid and expect to reverse the poverty trap in Africa. Just like any other start-up, developing nations absolutely must receive the amount of aid necessary (and promised at the G-8 Summit in 2005) for them to begin to reverse the poverty trap. The problem is that unlike start-ups, which simply go bankrupt if they fail to receive funding, in Africa people continue to die at a high rate due in large part to lack of sufficient aid.

Sachs points out that the extreme poor lack six major kinds of capital: human capital, business capital, infrastructure, natural capital, public institutional capital, and knowledge capital.  He then details the poverty trap: The poor start with a very low level of capital per person, and then find themselves trapped in poverty because the ratio of capital per person actually falls from generation to generation. The amount of capital per person declines when the population is growing faster than capital is being accumulated ... The question for growth in per capita income is whether the net capital accumulation is large enough to keep up with population growth.

Sachs argues that sufficient foreign aid can make up for the lack of capital in poor countries, maintaining that, "If the foreign assistance is substantial enough, and lasts long enough, the capital stock rises sufficiently to lift households above subsistence."

Sachs believes the public sector should focus mainly on investments in human capital (health, education, nutrition), infrastructure (roads, power, water and sanitation, environmental conservation), natural capital (conservation of biodiversity and ecosystems), public institutional capital (a well-run public administration, judicial system, police force), and parts of knowledge capital (scientific research for health, energy, agriculture, climate, ecology).  Sachs leaves business capital investments to the private sector, which he claims would more efficiently use funding to develop the profitable enterprises necessary to sustain growth. In this sense, Sachs views public institutions as useful in providing the public goods necessary to begin the Rostovian take-off model, but maintains that private goods are more efficiently produced and distributed by private enterprise. This is a widespread view in neoclassical economics.

Several other forms of poverty traps are discussed in the literature, including nations being landlocked with bad neighbors; a vicious cycle of violent conflict; subsistence traps in which farmers wait for middlemen before they specialize but middlemen wait for a region to specialize first; working capital traps in which petty sellers have inventories too sparse to earn enough money to get a bigger inventory; low skill traps in which workers wait for jobs using special skill but firms wait for workers to get such skills; nutritional traps in which individuals are too malnourished to work, yet too poor to afford sustainable food; and behavioral traps in which individuals cannot differentiate between temptation and non-temptation goods, and therefore cannot invest in the non-temptation goods which could help them begin to escape poverty.

See also

References

External links 

 "The Joint conference of African Ministers of Finance and Ministers of Economic Development and Planning Report." May, 1999, Addis Ababa, Ethiopia.
 Ajayi, S. Ibi, Mahsin, S. Khan. "External Debt and Capital Flight in Sub-Saharan Africa." IMF, 2000.
 Collier, Paul et al. "Flight Capital as a Portfolio Choice." Development Research Group, World Bank.
 Emeagwali, Philip. Interview, "How does capital flight affect the average African?"

Research on poverty
Child poverty
Urban decay
Economic problems
Waste of resources
Articles containing video clips
Development economics